Headless software (e.g. "headless Java" or "headless Linux",) is software capable of working on a device without a graphical user interface. Such software receives inputs and provides output through other interfaces like network or serial port and is common on servers and embedded devices.

The term "headless" is most often used when the ordinary version of the program requires that a graphics card or similar graphical interface device be present. For instance, the absence of a graphic card, mouse or keyboard may cause an initialization process that assumes their presence to fail, or the graphics card may be relied upon to build some offline image that is later served through network.

A headless computer (for example, and most commonly, a server) may be missing many of the system libraries that support the display of graphical interfaces. Software that expects these libraries may fail to start or even to compile if such libraries are not present. Software built on a headless machine must be built within command line tools only, without the aid of an IDE.

Headless websites 
Next to headless computers and headless software, the newest form of headless technology can be found in websites. Traditional websites have their own back-end and front-end (graphical user interface). All the pieces work with the same code base and communicate directly with each other, making the website as a whole. However in a headless installation the front-end is a stand-alone piece of software, which through API communicates with a back-end. Both parts operate separately from each other, and can even be placed on separate servers, creating a minimum version of a multi-server architecture. The bridge between both parts is the API client. The endpoints of the API are connected to each other.

The biggest advantages of this technology can be found in performance optimisation and flexibility of the software stack.

See also 
Secure Shell
Headless browser
Headless computer
Headless content management system

References 

Software engineering terminology